Viktor Lööv (born 16 November 1992) is a Swedish professional ice hockey defenseman currently playing for EHC Biel of the National League (NL).

Playing career
He began playing professionally with Södertälje SK in the Elitserien during the 2010–11 Elitserien season and 2011 Kvalserien, before moving to Modo Hockey for a solitary season in 2013–14.

On 16 April 2014, Lööv was signed to a three-year entry level contract with the Toronto Maple Leafs.

On 18 February 2016, following an injury to Matt Hunwick, Lööv was recalled by the Leafs on an emergency basis, and made his NHL debut the same night, in a game against the New York Rangers. Lööv recorded his first career NHL point, an assist on a goal scored by P. A. Parenteau, less than 5 minutes into the game.

Lööv would return to the Marlies the next season, and play there until a trade on 18 February 2017 (less than two weeks before the NHL trade deadline) sent him to the New Jersey Devils in exchange for forward Sergey Kalinin. Lööv would finish out the season with the Devils' AHL affiliate, the Albany Devils.

Lööv re-signed with the Devils on 9 May 2017, agreeing to a one-year, two-way contract worth $650,000. He was assigned to begin the 2017–18 season, with inaugural affiliate, the Binghamton Devils. On 8 February 2018, the New Jersey Devils traded Lööv to the Minnesota Wild in exchange for Christoph Bertschy and Mario Lucia.

On 25 May 2018, Lööv signed with Jokerit of the Kontinental Hockey League (KHL).

Lööv remained with Jokerit for three seasons, leaving the club following the 2020–21 season to sign a one-year contract with Swiss club, EHC Biel-Bienne of the NL on 25 May 2021.

Career statistics

Regular season and playoffs

International

References

External links
 

1992 births
Living people
Albany Devils players
EHC Biel players
Binghamton Devils players
Iowa Wild players
Jokerit players
Modo Hockey players
People from Södertälje
Södertälje SK players
Swedish expatriate ice hockey players in Canada
Swedish ice hockey defencemen
Toronto Maple Leafs draft picks
Toronto Maple Leafs players
Toronto Marlies players
Sportspeople from Stockholm County